CRRC Qingdao Sifang Co., Ltd. is a Chinese rolling stock manufacturer based in Qingdao, Shandong province. Founded in 1900 during the German occupation, Qingdao Sifang is one of the oldest rolling stock manufacturers in China.

History

Qing Dynasty and the Republic of China Era

Founding of the Syfang General Repair Works
Following the Juye Incident, the German army landed at Tsingtao in 1897. In 1898, the Qing government signed the Jiao'ao Concession Treaty with Germany, which made Tsingtao a German colony. This treaty also granted the German government the right to build the Jiaoji Railway and develop the mineral deposits along the route.

Kaiser Wilhelm II was determined to make Tsingtao a "model colony" and a bridgehead for the German army in the Far East. As a result, German authorities built a number of factories in Tsingtao between 1900 and 1910. In October 1900, while building the Jiaoji Railway, German authorities began constructing the Shantung Railway Syfang General Repair Works (Hauptreparatur-Werkstätte Syfang der Schantung-Eisenbahn), which was under the Shantung Railway Company (Schantung-Eisenbahn-Gesellschaft), with a total investment of 1,587,000 marks. It became China's third rolling stock factory after Tangshan and Dalian. The factory was located near the Sifang Railway Station in Sifang Village, with more than 10,000 square meters of factory spaces and more than 400 workers, and was completed in 1902. Locomotive parts were imported from Germany and assembly was conducted by the Sifang plant. By 1914, a total of 1,148 locomotives, coaches, and wagons had been assembled or repaired.

Times of Turmoil

In 1914, the First World War broke out, and Germany was occupied with war at the homefront. Japan and the United Kingdom took the opportunity and launched the Siege of Tsingtao. The Shantung Railway Syfang General Repair Works was damaged during the siege. In 1915, the Empire of Japan forced the Republic of China government to accept its Twenty-One Demands, which affirmed Japan's takeover of the German territories and railroad assets in Shantung. The Syfang General Repair Works was renamed Shantung Railway Syfang Workshop, which was temporarily managed by the Japanese Army. In March 1915, the Japanese army in Tsingtao established the Shantung Railway Administration, which had five departments: general affairs, transportation, engineering, accounting and mining, and the Tsingtao Workshop. During the Japanese occupation, additional facilities such as sand casting factories, passenger wagon yards, wheel factories, copper casting yards were built, and the number of employees reached more than 1,500.

Products and services

High Speed trains

 China Railway
 CRH1 as a joint venture between Bombardier Transportation
 CRH2 as a partly joint venture between Kawasaki Heavy Industries (KHI)
 CRH380A 
 CR400AF
 CRRC 600 (maglev)
 MTR Corporation
 Vibrant Express
 Kereta Cepat Indonesia China
 KCIC400AF (derived version of CR400AF)

Metro

 Beijing Subway 
 Line 1, Line 4, Daxing line, Line 8, Line 14, Line 16, Batong line, Changping line, Daxing Airport Express
 Guangzhou Metro
 Line 4, Line 5 and Line 6 in a joint venture with Kawasaki Heavy Industries
 Zhengzhou Metro
 Line 1
 MTR Corporation (Hong Kong)
 MTR Urban Lines Vision Train
 Chengdu Metro 
 Line 1 (Chengdu Metro)
 Line 2 (Chengdu Metro)
 Shenyang Metro 
 Line 2 (Shenyang Metro)
 Tianjin Metro 
 Line 3 (Tianjin Metro), Line 6 (Tianjin Metro)
Singapore Mass Rapid Transit 
 North South MRT line, East West MRT line, Thomson-East Coast MRT line
 Kawasaki Heavy Industries & CSR Qingdao Sifang C151A 
 Kawasaki Heavy Industries & CSR Qingdao Sifang C151B 
 Kawasaki Heavy Industries & CRRC Qingdao Sifang CT251 
 Kawasaki Heavy Industries & CRRC Qingdao Sifang C151C
 Qingdao Metro
 Chongqing Rail Transit
 Line 4, Line 5, Line 10
Chicago Transit Authority
7000 series (CTA)

Intercity Commuter

 China Railway
 CRH6 
 Trenes Argentinos
 CSR EMU (Argentina)

Light Rail Vehicle
 Qingdao Tram
 :zh:青岛有轨电车 as a joint venture with Škoda Transportation

Coach/Passenger car
 China Railway
 :zh:中国铁路25T型客车 as a partly joint venture between Bombardier Transportation
 Coaches for Turkmenistan
 SEPTA
 Multi-level cars (manufactured in China and finally assembly in Springfield, MA) for SEPTA Regional Rail lines
 CPTM
 2500 Series fleet, used exclusively in Line 13 - Jade.

Diesel Multiple Unit
 Costa Rica Interurban Line
 Iraqi Republic Railways
 Sri Lanka Railways
Sri Lanka Railways S9
 Sri Lanka Railways S10
 Sri Lanka Railways S12
Sri Lanka Railways S14 & S14A

R&D
 prototype of permanent magnet straddled-type monorail train in 2016.
 prototype of  monorail train in 2020.
 prototype of suspended type monorail train in 2017.
 manufacture of bi-level cars

Joint ventures

Bombardier Sifang (Qingdao) Transportation Ltd
Bombardier Sifang (Qingdao) Transportation Ltd was established in 1998 as a joint venture between Bombardier Transportation (Germany) and Sifang Locomotive and rolling stock company limited as a company for the production of high speed trains and high quality coaches. This joint venture includes a new IS development named JOSS (joint venture operating system support)

By 2009 it had delivered over 1000 units, including the CRH1E (Zefiro 250) high speed sleeper trains, and had secured an order for 80 CRH380D (Zefiro 380) very high speed trains in an order estimated to be worth €2.7 billion ($4 billion, 27.4billion RMB) in total.

Kawasaki Heavy Industries with CRRC Sifang Co Ltd
Kawasaki Heavy Industries (KHI) co-operated with CRRC Sifang Co Ltd. in year 2009 to produce the C151A trains, the fourth generation MRT train for SMRT Trains, in Singapore. A total of 22 trainsets were built with 6 carriages each.

By 2010, half of the trainsets are completed, and testing was done in 2011 by Kawasaki Heavy Industries, before full delivery in December 2011. These trains now serves the North South Line & East West Line in Singapore.

Another 78 cars (13 trainsets) of C151A trains which in production to be delivered by 2014.

In 2012, KHI and CSR Sifang will collaborate to manufacture the new 168 cars (28 trainsets) of C151B trains and will deliver from 2015 till 2017.

An additional 174 cars (29 trainsets) of C151B trains were ordered in 2014 and will be delivered from 2017 till 2019 and a total of 57 trains but they have been reduced to 45 set as they announced and the first trainset was delivered in 2015, Another 12 set of C151C trains are expected to be added by 2019 which were ordered in 2015.

In 2013, Kawasaki Heavy Industries (KHI) planned to sue CSR Sifang for patent infringement after their partnership was dissolved. KHI said it deeply regretted entering into the partnership. KHI subsequently dropped the action.

In 2014, LTA had ordered the new 364 cars (91 trainsets with 4 cars) of T251 Trains with manufacture by KHI and CSR Sifang for future Thomson-East Coast Line and will have fully automated and driverless trains, and also the first trains in Singapore to have 5 doors on each side and each carriage, These 91 new trains will deliver from 2018 onwards.

Issues with C151A trains

On 5 July 2016, a Hong Kong Based non-profit news organization FactWire had broken the news of SMRT C151A suffering from multiple defects  relating to Chinese-made materials and posted the entire investigative works in YouTube. and most of its claims are subsequently acknowledged by the rail operator SMRT and the transport authorities in Singapore, Land Transport Authority. The entire issue has since generated a huge amount of controversies in Hong Kong and Singapore with some rumors spreading in the Internet as well.

Astra Vagoane with CRRC Qingdao Sifang

On 9 september 2020 Bucharest City Hall sent to the Association Astra Vagoane (Romania) - CRRC Qingdao Sifang (China) a "Communication on the outcome of the award procedure for Purchase of 100 trams. By this address, the mentioned association is notified that the winner of the procurement procedure has been designated and that it will be informed of the date and time when the contract will be signed."

The town hall will pay 840 million Romanian lei (200 million USD) for 100  ASTRA trams.

References

Literature

External links

 

 
CRRC Group